Aniruddha Bhalchandra Pandit (born 7 December 1957) is an Indian chemical engineer, inventor and academic, known for his fundamental and commercial research on cavitational reactors, design of multiphase reactors, bubble dynamics. He is the vice chancellor of the Institute of Chemical Technology, Mumbai (erstwhile UDCT) since 2019, succeeding G. D. Yadav.

In 2023, he was elected member of the United States National Academy of Engineering.

Education and career
Pandit was born in Mumbai, Maharashtra to Bhalchandra Ramachandra and Sumati Pandit and attended the Institute of Technology, Banaras Hindu University. He graduated with a B.Tech. (Chem) degree in 1980 and joined the University Department of Chemical Technology of Bombay University (now ICT Mumbai) for his PhD (Tech) degree. He completed his PhD in 1984 under the guidance of Prof. Jyeshtharaj Joshi. HE also worked as an instructor during this term.

From 1984 till 1990, he worked in University of Cambridge as a Research Associate with John Frank Davidson, working in the area of bubble break-up and design of multiphase reactors.

Pandit joined the UICT in 1991 as a reader and was promoted in 1996. He was a visiting professor at University of Cape Town and University of California, Santa Barbara, BITS Pilani, among others. He is an elected fellow of such science academies as United States National Academy of Engineering, Indian National Academy of Engineering, Indian National Science Academy (INSA), The World Academy of Sciences (2015), National Academy of Sciences, India, Maharashtra Academy of Sciences, and Indian Academy of Sciences.

Research 
Pandit is a renowned researcher in the field of cavitation and relevant chemical processing applications. His research interests include sonochemistry, industrial wastewater treatment, synthesis of chelating agents for wastewater treatment, mixing in mechanically agitated contactors, and the design of nozzles for hydrodynamic cavitation. Pandit has also worked on polymer degradation, cellulose dissolution, and nanomaterials synthesis. , he has published 415 journal articles, and holds 17 patents. His articles are reported to have an H-index of 98 and i10-Index of 358. He has guided 56 PhD and 86 master's graduates.

He is associated with a number of scientific journals as a member of their editorial boards; Ultrasonics Sonochemistry Journal (Elsevier), Chemical Engineering and Processing - Process Intensification (Elsevier), Industrial & Engineering Chemistry Research (ACS).

See also 
 Institute of Chemical Technology
 Man Mohan Sharma

References

External links

1957 births
Living people
People from Mumbai
20th-century Indian chemists
20th-century Indian engineers
20th-century Indian inventors
Academic staff of Birla Institute of Technology and Science, Pilani
Academic staff of the University of Mumbai
Academic staff of the University of Cape Town
Academics of the University of Cambridge
Engineers from Maharashtra
Fellows of the Indian National Science Academy
Foreign associates of the National Academy of Engineering
Heads of universities and colleges in India
Indian chemical engineers
Indian patent holders
Indian scientific authors
Institute of Chemical Technology alumni
Members of the United States National Academy of Engineering
TWAS fellows
University of California, Santa Barbara faculty
University of Mumbai alumni